Euxesta nitidiventris is a species of ulidiid or picture-winged fly in the genus Euxesta of the family Ulidiidae. Larvae are known to be pests of maize.

References

nitidiventris
Insects described in 1873